Frome St Quintin is a village in the county of Dorset in southern England, situated approximately  northwest of the county town Dorchester. It is sited on an outcrop of greensand near the head of the Frome valley, among chalk hills of the Dorset Downs. Dorset County Council's latest (2013) estimate of the parish population is 150. There are naturally occurring springs in the area and the first habitation is likely to have been during the Roman era. The parish church dates from the 13th century.

References

External links 

Villages in Dorset